Martin Butler (born 4 May 1952) is an Australian director, producer, and filmmaker. He is known for his work First Footprints (2013), Tanna (2015) and A Sense of Self (2016). For Tanna, he received a nomination for Best Foreign Language Film at 89th Academy Awards.

Filmography
 A Sense of Self (director, producer) (2016)
 Tanna (director, producer and writer) (2015) 
 First Footprints (director, producer and writer) (2013)

Accolades

References

External links

Australian film producers
Australian film directors
Australian screenwriters
Living people
1952 births
Walkley Award winners